Falu Ishockeyförening (literally Falu Ice Hockey Association) or Falu IF is an ice hockey club located in the Swedish city of Falun in Dalarna.  The club currently plays in the Western group of Division 2, the fourth tier of the Swedish ice hockey system, and plays their matches in Lugnets Ishall with a capacity for 3108 spectators.

Recent seasons

References

External links
Official website
Team profile at Eliteprospects.com

Ice hockey teams in Sweden
Ice hockey teams in Dalarna County